Survival International is a human rights organisation formed in 1969, a London based charity that campaigns for the rights of indigenous and/or tribal peoples and uncontacted peoples.

The organisation's campaigns generally focus on tribal peoples' desires to keep their ancestral lands. Survival International calls these peoples "some of the most vulnerable on earth", and aims to eradicate what it calls "misconceptions" used to justify violations of human rights. It also aims to publicize harm caused to tribes by corporations and governments. Survival International states that it aims to help foster tribal people's self-determination.

Survival International is in association with the Department of Public Information of the United Nations and in consultative status with the United Nations Economic and Social Council. To ensure freedom of action, Survival accepts no government funding. It is a founding member and a signatory organization of the International NGO Accountability Charter (INGO Accountability Charter). Survival has offices in Amsterdam, Berlin, London, Madrid, Milan, Paris and San Francisco.

History
Survival International was founded in 1969 after an article by Norman Lewis in The Sunday Times Magazine highlighted the massacres, land thefts and genocide taking place in Brazilian Amazonia. In 1971, the fledgling organisation visited Brazil to observe the Fundação Nacional do Índio (FUNAI) government agency responsible for tribal peoples there. Survival International incorporated as an English company in 1972 and registered as a charity in 1974. According to the autobiography of its first chairman, the explorer Robin Hanbury-Tenison, while travelling with the ethnobotanist Conrad Gorinsky in the Amazon in 1968,

It was the first in this field to use mass letter-writing, having orchestrated several campaigns in many different places throughout the world, such as Siberia, Canada and Kenya. Several campaigns were able to bring change to government policies regarding the rights of local indigenous people. In 2000, this form of struggle was successful in driving the Indian government to abandon their plan to relocate the isolated Jarawa tribe, after receiving 150-200 letters a day from Survival supporters around the world. Shortly before that, the governor of western Siberia imposed a five-year ban on all oil licences in the territory of the Yugan Khanty within weeks of Survival issuing a bulletin. Survival was also the first organisation to draw attention to the destructive effects of World Bank projects – now recognised as a major cause of suffering in many poor countries.

Survival is the only international pro-tribal peoples organisation to have received the Right Livelihood Award, as well as the Spanish "Premio Léon Felipe" and the Italian "Medaglia della Presidenza della Camera dei Deputati".

Structure and aims
Survival International works for tribal peoples' rights on three complementary levels: education, advocacy and campaigns. It also offers tribal people a platform to address the world, while connecting with local indigenous organisations, with focus on tribal peoples under more urgent threat from contact with the outside world. The educational programs are aimed at people in the Western world, aiming at "demolishing the myth that tribal people are relics, destined to perish through 'progress'". Survival seeks to promote respect for their cultures and explain their relevance today in preserving their way of life.

Survival has supporters in 82 countries. Its materials are published in many languages throughout the world. It is a registered charity in the United Kingdom and the equivalent in Germany, France, Italy, Spain and the United States, and can receive tax-free donations in the Netherlands.

Survival refuses government funding, depending exclusively on public support, in order to ensure freedom of action. All the people sent into the field belong to Survival International staff, none are sponsored volunteers or visitors of any kind. Overseas projects are carried and managed by tribes themselves.

Tribes
There are more than 150 million tribal people worldwide, including at least 100 uncontacted peoples in 60 countries. Survival International supports these endangered tribes on a global level, with campaigns established in America, Africa and Asia. Most of them have been persecuted and face genocide by diseases, relocation from their homes by logging and mining, and eviction by settlers. 

Survival believes that indigenous rights to land ownership, although recognised by international law, are not effectively respected, with tribes being invaded by activities such as oil and mineral mining, logging, cattle ranching, private or government "development" schemes such as building of roads and dams, or for nature reserves and game parks. Beyond these economic causes for exploitive invasions, Survival highlights ignorance and racism that sees tribal peoples as backward and primitive. Survival believes that in the long-term, public opinion is the most effective force for change.

The impact of the outside world on the existence of indigenous peoples and their cultures is described as being very dramatic. In Siberia, only 10% of the tribal peoples live a nomadic or semi-nomadic life, compared to 70% 30 years ago. In Brazil – where Survival believes most of the world's uncontacted tribes, probably more than 50, live – there are about 400 speakers for 110 languages. For authors such as Daniel Everett, this phenomenon represents a fundamental assault on the existence of peoples, as language expresses the way a group of people experience reality in a unique way, and it is a part of our common heritage. Ranka Bjeljac-Babic, lecturer and specialist in the psychology of language, describes an intrinsic and causal link between the threat of biological diversity and cultural diversity. The assault on indigenous customs and traditions is described as part of a larger assault on life, with its historical roots in colonization. Survival's report Progress can Kill highlights that the invasion of the Americas and Australia by Europeans eliminated 90% of the indigenous population on these continents. The threat of genocide continues.

Most fundamentally, Survival believes that it is the respect for the right to keep their land that may allow them to survive. The issues of human rights and freedom depend on the land on which they can subsist and develop according to their own culture. Interference with this basic need endangers their capacity to live sustainably.

In January 2019, the newly elected president of Brazil Jair Bolsonaro stripped the indigenous affairs agency FUNAI of the responsibility to identify and demarcate indigenous lands. He argued that those territories have very tiny isolated populations and proposed to integrate them into the larger Brazilian society. According to the Survival International, "Taking responsibility for indigenous land demarcation away from FUNAI, the Indian affairs department, and giving it to the Agriculture Ministry is virtually a declaration of open warfare against Brazil's tribal peoples."

Campaigns
Survival International campaigns for the uncontacted tribes in the territory of Peru, many unidentified indigenous people in Brazil, Russia, West Papua, and about 30 tribes in several countries in South America, Africa and Asia. They select their cases based on a criterion the organisation has established, which depends on a wide range of factors, such as the reliability and continuity of the information, the gravity of the situation the tribe in question is facing, the degree to which they believe their work can make a real difference, the degree to which improvements in this area would have a knock on effect for others, whether any other organisation is already working on the case, and whether they are sure of what the people themselves want.

A common threat to the tribes for which Survival campaigns is the invasion of their lands for exploration of resources. This invariably leads to forced relocation, loss of sustainability and forced changes in their way of living. Usually, this is accompanied by diseases from the contact with the outsiders for which they have an unprepared immune system – this threat alone can wipe out entire tribes. Logging and/or cattle ranchers have affected most of these tribes, from South America, Africa to Australasia. The Arhuaco, in Colombia, have drug plantations, associated with crossfire from guerilla wars between cartel and government interests. The Ogiek, in Kenya, have tea plantations, and the Amungme in Indonesia, the San in Botswana, the Dongria Kondh in India, and the Palawan in the Philippines have mining fields.

Survival international has also pointed out in their campaigns against the assault on their way of living the effect of the work of missionaries. The Arhuaco, Ayoreo, Aborigines, the Innu and several tribes in West Papua have all suffered direct attacks on their culture from what, in the perspective of Survival, may constitute good intention, but nevertheless is destructive to their lives. The children of the Khanty and Wanniyala-Aetto have been kidnapped to be raised in foreign religions and culture. In the long run, these practices are successful in assimilating and destroying a group of people.

Besides suffering the genocide brought about through disease and hunger (which is the result of losing their natural environment and having fertile soil stolen from them), Survival says some tribes have suffered campaigns of direct assassination. Most tribes in South America, such as the Awá, Akuntsu, Guaraní and the Yanomami, have been murdered on sight by multinational workers, ranchers and gunmen for hire, while tribes in Africa and Asia have suffered waves of murder at the hands of the government. Survival International has pointed to the tribe Akuntsu, of which only five members still remain, as an example of what this threat represents: the eventual genocide of a whole people.

Survival International has called attention to the rise in suicide in tribal peoples such as the Innu, Australian Aborigines and the Guarani, as a consequence of outside interference with the tribes' cultures and direct persecution. Suffering from the trauma of forced relocation, many tribal people find themselves in despair living in an environment they are not used to, where there is nothing useful to do, and where they are treated with racist disdain by their new neighbours. Other social consequences from this displacement have been pointed out to alcoholism and violence, with campaigns reporting the cases of the Innu, Mursi, Bodi, Konso and Wanniyala-Aetto. Tribal peoples are also more vulnerable to sexual exploitation. Among the tribes with whom Survival International has campaigned, there has been reported rapes of girls and women by workers of invading companies in the indigenous tribes of Penan, West Papuan tribes, Jummas and Jarawa.

The government role in these territories varies. Most Brazilian tribes are protected under law, while in reality there has been resistance in policies and strong support for enterprises that carry out these threats on their existence. In Africa, the San tribes and other tribes have been persecuted with beating and torture to force relocation, as well as murder in the Nuba, and in the Bangladesh, Asia, with the Jummas. Sometimes governments offer compensations that are believed by Survival to be unwanted alternatives for the tribes, portrayed as "development".

In April 2012, Survival International launched a worldwide campaign, backed by actor Colin Firth, to protect the Awa-Guajá people of Brazil, which the organization considers to be the "earth's most threatened tribe".

In late 2015, Survival International started the Stop the Con campaign, which seeks to raise awareness about negative impacts of traditional conservation policies on tribal peoples. This campaign is part of Survival International's larger campaign on conservation.

Media attention
Survival International has received attention in the media over the years with the campaigns and work of volunteer supporters. Celebrity endorsements include Richard Gere, who has spoken up for the Jumma of Bangladesh, Julie Christie, who gave a Radio 4 appeal on behalf of the Khanty of Siberia, Judi Dench, who warned of the events surrounding the Arhuaco of Colombia, and Colin Firth, who spoke out against the eviction of the San tribe, and in favour of the Awa-Guajá people.

However, the media have not always been sympathetic towards the organisation. In 1995, the Independent Television Commission banned one of Survival International's advertisements, citing the Broadcasting Act 1990, which states that organisations cannot advertise their work if it is wholly or mainly of a political nature. The ad was broadcast on the music cable channel The Box and the MTV satellite offshoot VH-1. It featured Richard Gere urging viewers to help to stop the slaughter and exploitation of tribal people.

Another controversy ensued after an article in The Observer cast doubt on Survival International's reporting of an uncontacted tribe in Peru, which included a picture with tribesmen firing arrows up at an aircraft. After a heated confrontation that dragged for a couple of months, with threats of taking Survival International to court for libel, The Observer ended up conceding in August 2008 that it had got the story wrong. In a clarification, the newspaper stated: "While The Observer cannot be responsible for content of other media it does have a duty under the Editors' Code not to publish 'inaccurate, misleading or distorted information'. It failed in that duty here."

The Government of Botswana, with whom Survival International has had a long-standing disagreement over the government's treatment of the San people in the Central Kalahari Game Reserve, has complained about uneven coverage in the mainstream media. The San have challenged the government in court several times regarding their right to remain on their land without interference. Ian Khama, President of Botswana, stated that Survival International is "denying them and especially their children opportunities to grow with the mainstream", forcing indigenous peoples into maintaining "a very backward form of life". It has been alleged that the Botswana government "has instructed all departmental heads in the state media to ensure that any negative reporting on the controversial relocations from the Central Kalahari Game Reserve (CKGR) should be contrasted strongly with freshly-sought government statements." In May 2013, Survival International accused the government of plans to evict San from their homes in Ranyane. Government representative Jeff Ramsay denied this allegation and described Survival International as a "neo-Apartheid organisation". Survival International subsequently reported that on May 28, Botswana's High Court had ruled that the eviction be suspended until mid-June. A Survival International campaigner was quoted as saying: "I don't know how the government can say there is no case, and that they are not planning to evict them when the Ranyane Bushmen are taking the government to court to stop from being removed." The director of Khwedom Council, Keibakile Mogodu, said, "We have been deliberating on the issue with government officials, yes I can confirm that government was due to relocate [six hundred] Basarwa on Monday, [May 27th]." A case has been filed on the San's behalf.

In 2005, Survival published the book There You Go! (Oren Ginzburg), which depicted a tribal society being harmed by development. In the book's foreword, Stephen Corry wrote: "The 'development' of tribal peoples against their wishes – really to let others get their land and resources – is rooted in 19th century colonialism ('We know best') dressed up in 20th century 'political correct' euphemism. Tribal peoples are not backward: they are independent and vibrant societies which, like all of us always, are constantly adapting to a changing world. The main difference between tribal peoples and us is that we take their land and resources, and believe the dishonest, even racist, claim that it's for their own good. It's conquest, not development. If you really want to understand what's going on, read this book."

Survival International encourages supporters to use multiple media to spread awareness on indigenous rights issues. In the guide Walk Your Talk, the organisation gives tips on a variety of actions, from writing letters to governments, to spreading the word through sponsorships, leaflets, demonstrations, film shows, and collecting money from a variety of events.

See also 
 Cultural Survival
 Declaration on the Rights of Indigenous Peoples
 Friends of Peoples Close to Nature
 Songs for Survival

References

Sources 
  (First published by Granada, 1984)

External links 
 

1969 establishments in the United Kingdom
Human rights organisations based in the United Kingdom
Indigenous rights organizations
International charities
International human rights organizations
International organisations based in London
Organisations based in the London Borough of Islington
Organizations established in 1969
Political organisations based in London